Saint Francis High School is a Roman Catholic high school, and one of the largest in Calgary, serving 2006 students in the communities of northwest Calgary, Alberta.

History
The school opened in 1962 with an enrollment of 466 students in three grades (9–11) and offered academic, commercial (business) and technical programs. By 1965 enrollment doubled and the vocational wings were constructed including shop areas for automotive, carpentry, electronics & electricity, drafting, commercial art, beauty culture, hot metals and lithograph. Two science labs, one multi-activity area and eight classrooms completed the addition. In 1983, two of the areas were renovated to house the Home Economics facilities and in 2000, a new library, media environment and music room were added along with new computer and science labs and numerous classrooms. In July 2017 modernization construction began on the school on the original section of the building, providing a new chapel, Culinary Arts area, expanded gymnasium facilities and a brighter, more open student commons.

The school's patron saint is Saint Francis of Assisi.

Athletics
Saint Francis competes and participates as a Division I member school in the Calgary Senior High School Athletic Association (student body populous 1700+) and the Alberta Schools Athletic Association. Its acclaimed sports programs have amassed several city and provincial championships. Its football program, has won thirty eight city titles (twenty four Senior Varsity Division I & fourteen Junior Varsity Division I), and seven Alberta Schools Athletic Association Senior Varsity Tier I Provincial titles (school population 1250+).

In addition, the school hosts two mid-winter basketball tournaments. The St Francis Invitational (SFI) is an eight team tournament that invites several senior boys varsity teams from rival city & provincial high schools, as well as schools from Western Canada and occasionally from the United States (specifically Laredo, Texas) to compete in a two-day tourney. The Browns' Invitational Tournament is an eight team tournament that hosts feeder schools from the Calgary Catholic junior high school system which is held weeks after the SFI.

Academics

Music Program
St. Francis High School comprises over 100 students in the various grades of 10,11,12.

Drama Program
St. Francis High School offers classes in Drama, Advanced Acting, Musical Theatre, Technical Theatre, and Dance.  Students in these programs are entered into competition and festivals, and the program stages a fall production, spring production, musical theatre revue, and dance show, culminating in an evening gala featuring dance, choir, band, theatre, and visual art exhibitions and performances.

Career and Technology Studies 
St. Francis offers a comprehensive selection of course in Business, Practical and Technical Arts.

Notable alumni 
Michelle Conn - Former Field Hockey Player
Mike Cvik - NHL Linesmen
John Forzani - Former CFL Player, chairman and co-founder of the FGL Sports
Tom Forzani - Former CFL Player
Javier Glatt - Former CFL Linebacker
Alex Hicks - Former NHL Forward
Rolly Lumbala - Former CFL Fullback
Marco Iannuzzi - BC Lions Player
Brian Pockar - Former Figure Skater
Bruce Robertson - Former Rower & Olympic Champion
Anita Vandenbeld - Canadian Member of Parliament

References

External links

St Francis Senior High Official Web Site

High schools in Calgary
Catholic secondary schools in Alberta
Educational institutions established in 1962
1962 establishments in Alberta